

290001–290100 

|-
| 290001 Uebersax ||  || Robert Uebersax (born 1963), a Swiss amateur astronomer and member of the Jura Astronomy Society || 
|-id=074
| 290074 Donasadock ||  || Dona Sadock (born 1945), producer of the Firesign Theater and radio programs, and a friend of French discoverer Bernard Christophe || 
|}

290101–290200 

|-id=127
| 290127 Linakostenko ||  || Lina Kostenko (born 1930), an awarded Ukrainian poet and writer of the Sixtiers cultural movement || 
|-id=129
| 290129 Rátzlászló ||  || László Rátz (1863–1930) was a Hungarian mathematics teacher best known for educating John von Neumann and Nobel laureate Eugene Wigner. He was a teacher of the Budapest Lutheran Gymnasium. Between 1894–1914 he was editor-in-chief of the Mathematical and Physical Journal for Secondary Schools. || 
|}

290201–290300 

|-bgcolor=#f2f2f2
| colspan=4 align=center | 
|}

290301–290400 

|-bgcolor=#f2f2f2
| colspan=4 align=center | 
|}

290401–290500 

|-bgcolor=#f2f2f2
| colspan=4 align=center | 
|}

290501–290600 

|-bgcolor=#f2f2f2
| colspan=4 align=center | 
|}

290601–290700 

|-bgcolor=#f2f2f2
| colspan=4 align=center | 
|}

290701–290800 

|-bgcolor=#f2f2f2
| colspan=4 align=center | 
|}

290801–290900 

|-bgcolor=#f2f2f2
| colspan=4 align=center | 
|}

290901–291000 

|-bgcolor=#f2f2f2
| colspan=4 align=center | 
|}

References 

290001-291000